Deimos  (meaning “dread”) is the personal god of dread and terror in Greek mythology. He was a son of Ares and Aphrodite, and the brother of Phobos. Deimos served to represent the feelings of dread and terror that befell those before a battle, while Phobos personified feelings of fear and panic in the midst of battle.

The god's Roman equivalent was Formido or Metus.

Mythology
Deimos was the son of Ares and Aphrodite. He mainly appears in an assistant role to his father, who causes disorder in armies. In the Iliad, he accompanied his father, Ares, into battle with the Goddess of Discord, Eris, and his brother Phobos (fear). In Shield of Herakles, Phobos and Deimos accompany Ares into battle and remove him from the field once Herakles injures him. In Nonnus' Dionysiaca, Zeus arms Phobos with lightning and Deimos with thunder to frighten Typhon. Later in the work, Phobos and Deimos act as Ares' charioteers to battle Dionysus during his war against the Indians.

On the modern monument to the battle of Thermopylae, as well as the one at the city of Sparta, Leonidas' shield has a representation of Deimos.

Namesake
In 1877, the American astronomer Asaph Hall discovered the two satellites of the planet Mars. Hall named the two moons Phobos and Deimos. Deimos is the smaller of the two satellites.

Notes

References 
 Hesiod, Shield of Heracles from The Homeric Hymns and Homerica with an English Translation by Hugh G. Evelyn-White, Cambridge, MA.,Harvard University Press; London, William Heinemann Ltd. 1914. Online version at the Perseus Digital Library. Greek text available from the same website.
 Hesiod, Theogony from The Homeric Hymns and Homerica with an English Translation by Hugh G. Evelyn-White, Cambridge, MA.,Harvard University Press; London, William Heinemann Ltd. 1914. Online version at the Perseus Digital Library. Greek text available from the same website.
 Homer, The Iliad with an English Translation by A.T. Murray, Ph.D. in two volumes. Cambridge, MA., Harvard University Press; London, William Heinemann, Ltd. 1924. . Online version at the Perseus Digital Library.
 Homer, Homeri Opera in five volumes. Oxford, Oxford University Press. 1920. . Greek text available at the Perseus Digital Library.

Greek war deities
Greek gods
War gods
Children of Aphrodite
Children of Ares
Personifications in Greek mythology